Feel Good Radio is a Dutch radio station that plays classic hits from the 60s till the '00s.

The station first started out as a station serving the cities of Brecht and Essen, near the Dutch border in Belgium. The station ended operations a year later. It would later resume broadcasts in December 2014 with a transmitter in the city of Pijnacker-Nootdorp and later expand their over the air coverage in 2015 with a transmitter in Rijswijk. The station can currently be heard in the Haaglanden area near The Hague.

Radio stations in the Netherlands
Dutch-language radio stations

Not to be mistaken with a new internet radio station based in Devon The Feelgood Station.uk